Chepchumba, or Jepchumba, is a surname of Kenyan origin meaning "daughter of Chumba". It may refer to:

Beatrice Jepchumba (born 1983), Kenyan long-distance runner
Joyce Chepchumba (born 1970), Kenyan marathon runner and past winner of the London, Chicago and New York marathons
Pamela Chepchumba (born 1979), Kenyan half marathon and marathon runner
Peninah Jepchumba (born 1985), Kenyan middle- and long-distance runner
Peris Chepchumba (born 1968), Kenyan politician and Member of the National Assembly for the Orange Democratic Movement
Rose Jepchumba (born 1979), Kenyan long-distance runner
Salome Chepchumba (born 1982), Kenyan steeplechase runner
Violah Jepchumba (born 1990), Kenyan half marathon runner

See also
Kipchumba, related name meaning "son of Chumba"

Kalenjin names